Thomas "Tam" Scobbie (born 31 March 1988 in Falkirk) is a Scottish professional footballer who plays for Berwick Rangers.

He has previously played for Falkirk, St Johnstone. Dundee United. Partick Thistle, Brechin City, and Kelty Hearts. Scobbie was a regular squad member for the Scotland under-21 national team.

Youth career
Scobbie played most of his football as a boy with Grangemouth Boys Club, whilst attending Graeme High School. An intelligent student (sic), he mixed his studies well with football but left in fourth-year to pursue a career in the game. At age twelve, Scobbie joined Falkirk's academy team becoming the youngest player to sign a schoolboy form for the club.

Club career

Falkirk
Scobbie made his debut for Falkirk on 30 April 2005 against Hamilton Academical. He made his Scottish Premier League (SPL) debut against Dundee United in a 2–1 victory. Scobbie made seventeen appearances in his first season. On 18 February 2007, Scobbie received a red card for the first time in his career after he was caught in a late with Chris Burke, resulting a straight red card for Scobbie.

In 2007–08 season, Scobbie made a good start for the club in the opening game of the season after he provided an assist for Michael Higdon, as Falkirk beat Gretna 4–0. However, Scobbie was criticized during a performance against Hearts and this resulted him being dropped. He later make up his mistake when Hearts and Falkirk meet again and scored his first goal for the club and then provided an assist for Carl Finnigan, in a 2–1 win over Hearts on 5 May 2008. The 2007–08 season proved to be Scobbie's breakthrough season, as he made thirty-three appearances and scored once. In February 2008, Scobbie signed a five-year contract with the club.

In 2008–09 season, Scobbie was diagnosed with a pelvic injury. After two months out, Scobbie made his return on the bench, as Falkirk lost 2–1 to Inverness Caledonian Thistle, but didn't play. Scobbie made his return to playing, as Falkirk beat Hearts 2–1 on 13 September 2008. Later in the end of September, Manager John Hughes commented that Scobbie's progression could see him being captain and could be a manager. On 26 April 2009, he scored in a 2–0 win against Dunfermline Athletic in the Scottish Cup semi-final, however Falkirk went on to lose 1–0 to Rangers in the final. Ahead of the Scottish Cup final, Scobbie scored his first goal of the season, in a 2–1 win over Motherwell on 2 May 2009. Following the loss, Scobbie said the defeat left him "heartbroken".

Ahead of the 2009–10 season, Scobbie was among three players to be linked a move away from Falkirk, as he was keen to sit down with the club's board to discuss the fresh terms. Scobbie made his European debut for the club against FC Vaduz of Liechtenstein, but lost 2–1 in a two-legged tie. The season started without the manager, John Hughes, who left for Hibernian. In October, Scobbie sustained a recurrence of his pelvic problems, which caused him to be pulled out of Scotland's Under-21 squad. Scobbie revealed he had taken 12 injections and unsuccessfully had a hernia operations twice. In late January, Scobbie recovered from injuries. Following his return, Scobbie was unable to help the club survive relegation and was relegated to Division One.

The 2010–11 season was proved to be unsuccessful for Scobbie, as he made thirty-six appearances in all competitions and scored once against Dunfermline Athletic on 15 February 2011, in a 1–1 draw. After the season, Scobbie was linked with SPL clubs Kilmarnock and St Mirren.

On 1 April 2012, Scobbie played as Falkirk beat Hamilton Academical 1–0 to win the Challenge Cup. In May 2012, Scobbie announced he is to leave the club this summer and says his departure was "inevitable". In his last appearance against Ayr United in the last game of the season, Scobbie was given the captaincy and scored the opening goal from the penalty, as Falkirk won 3–2.

St Johnstone
Scobbie left Falkirk under freedom of contract in May 2012 and signed a two-year contract with St Johnstone. Scobbie made his debut for the club, where he made his first start, in a 2–1 loss against Aberdeen on 18 August 2012. However, Scobbie was unable to regain his first team place at St Johnstone, as he spent on the bench and had his own injury concerns.

At the beginning of the 2013–14 season, Scobbie played four Europa League matches, including the 1–0 win against Norwegian side Rosenberg in the second round of the Europa League first leg. St Johnstone would later be eliminated by Minsk in the drawing 1–1 in the second leg of Europa League after it went on penalties. In the league, Scobbie would be often used in first team ins and out in his second season at the club. Despite this, on 14 January 2014, Scobbie signed a contract with the club, which see Scobbie stay until the end of the 2014-15 season. A week after signing a new deal, Scobbie was an involved in the incident during the match against Hearts after Scottish Football Association issued a notice on Scobbie and was considering banning him for two games. In conclusion, Scobbie would miss two games after the club decided against appeal. During the match against Inverness Caledonian Thistle, which they lost 1–0 on 22 February 2014, Scobbie sustained ligament damage, though he came on for Frazer Wright. After an operation, it was announced that Scobbie would be out for the remainder of the season. Scobbie was part of the successful side that went on to win the 2013-14 Scottish Cup.

At the start of the 2014–15 season, Scobbie played three out of the four Europa League matches for St Johnstone. Scobbie helped St Johnstone progress to the next round after he converted the winning penalty shoot-out, putting St Johnstone through to the next round. Having featured for the first five matches, Scobbie suffered medial ligament damage that requires repairment, resulting him out for three months. Though making his return, Scobbie remained on the substitute bench until he made his return on the pitch, coming on as a substitute for Brian Easton in the 82nd minute, in a 2–0 win over Partick Thistle on 17 January 2015. On 13 April 2015, Scobbie signed a new two-year contract with St Johnstone, keeping him at the club until 2017. Scobbie later made twenty appearances for the club.

Dundee United
After leaving St Johnstone Scobbie signed for Scottish Championship club Dundee United on 13 June 2017. However, just six games into the new campaign, a torn groin muscle in a League Cup tie with Dundee saw him ruled out of action for nearly two months. He returned at the end of October, and featured regularly at full-back and the centre of defence as United qualified for a Play-off spot.

Scobbie joined Partick Thistle on loan in August 2018, being given the number 37 kit. He returned to Dundee United in January 2019 after making 8 appearances for Thistle.

Scobbie then joined Brechin City on loan on deadline day in January 2019, for the rest of the 2018–19 season. He was released by United at the end of the season.

Kelty Hearts
Scobbie signed for Lowland League club Kelty Hearts in September 2019. He left Kelty at the end of the 2020–21 season.

Berwick Rangers 
Berwick Rangers announced the signing of Scobbie on a short term deal on 30 August 2021.

International career
In 2006, Scobbie was called up to represent Scotland U19 team. In 2008, Scobbie stated that he hoped he makes it to the senior team under the new management of George Burley.

The same year, Scobbie was called by the Scotland U21 team.

Career statistics

Honours
Falkirk
Scottish Challenge Cup: 2011–12
 Scottish Cup: runner-up 2008–09

St Johnstone
 Scottish Cup: 2013–14

Kelty Hearts
Lowland League: 2019–20

References

External links

 

Living people
1988 births
Scottish footballers
Scottish Premier League players
Footballers from Falkirk
Falkirk F.C. players
St Johnstone F.C. players
Dundee United F.C. players
Scotland under-21 international footballers
People educated at Graeme High School
Scottish Football League players
Scotland youth international footballers
Scottish Professional Football League players
Association football fullbacks
Brechin City F.C. players
Kelty Hearts F.C. players
Lowland Football League players
Berwick Rangers F.C. players